The 1996 Vuelta a Burgos was the 18th edition of the Vuelta a Burgos road cycling stage race, which was held from 19 August to 23 August 1996. The race started and finished in Burgos. The race was won by Tony Rominger of the  team.

General classification

References

Vuelta a Burgos
1996 in road cycling
1996 in Spanish sport